Dudpukuria-Dhopachari Wildlife Sanctuary is a wildlife sanctuary located near Rangunia in Chittagong District of Bangladesh. The area was officially declared as a wildlife sanctuary by the government of Bangladesh on 6 April 2010.

See also
 List of wildlife sanctuaries of Bangladesh

References 

Wildlife sanctuaries of Bangladesh